Lisa Collins (born 1968) is an Australian actress best known for her starring role in the movie Fix (1997), and her portrayal of Louisa, the wife of Morgan Earp in the 1993 film Tombstone. Collins is also the ex-wife of actor Billy Zane.

Filmography

References

External links
 

1968 births
Australian film actresses
Living people